A Fazenda 10, also known as A Fazenda 10: Mais Conectada, stylized A Fazenda 10: + Conectada (English: The Farm 10: More Connected) is the tenth season of the Brazilian reality television series A Fazenda, which premiered Tuesday, September 18, 2018, at 10:45 p.m. on RecordTV.

Marcos Mion replaced Roberto Justus as the main host, while season 9 winner Flávia Viana makes her debut as the show's new special correspondent, replacing Sheila Mello.

Contestants
Biographical information according to Record official series site, plus footnoted additions.
(ages stated are at time of contest)

Future Appearances
After this season, in 2019, Cátia Paganote appeared in Dancing Brasil 5, she placed 6th in the competition.

In 2021, Nadja Pessoa appeared in Ilha Record 1, she finished in 6th place in the competition.

In 2022, Caique Aguiar appeared in Ilha Record 2, he finished in 8th place.

The game

Fire challenge
This season, contestants compete in the Fire challenge to win the Lamp power. The Lamp power entitles the holder the two flames (red and blue) which may unleash good or bad consequences on the nomination process, with the red flame power defined by the public through of R7.com among two options.

The winner chooses a flame for himself and delegates which contestant holds the other. The Flame holder's choice is marked in bold.

Results

Voting history

Notes

Ratings and reception

Brazilian ratings
All numbers are in points and provided by Kantar Ibope Media.

 In 2018, each point represents 248.647 households in 15 market cities in Brazil (71.855 households in São Paulo)

References

External links
 A Fazenda 10 on R7.com 

2018 Brazilian television seasons
A Fazenda